Lang Nunatak is an isolated nunatak located in the interior of southern Palmer Land, Antarctica, about  west of the head of Irvine Glacier. It was mapped by the United States Geological Survey from surveys and U.S. Navy air photos, 1961–67, and was named by the Advisory Committee on Antarctic Names for James F. Lang, a United States Antarctic Research Program Assistant Representative at Byrd Station, summer 1965–66.

References

Nunataks of Palmer Land